Mati Hint (born 28 August 1937 Tartu) is an Estonian linguist and politician. He was a member of VII Riigikogu.

References

Living people
1937 births
Linguists from Estonia
Members of the Riigikogu, 1992–1995